Jože Melaher - Zmagoslav (1913-1991) was Yugoslav military officer, most notable for being commander of Chetnik Štajerska detachment during the World War II.

Early life 
Melaher was born in Zrkovcih na Pobrežju, on 26 February 1913 from father Leopold and mother Apolonija, née name Klemenčič. Melaher's older brother Anton remained after the war on the farm. Joze finished gymnasium, then worked as a teacher and a staff member. In 1937 he married Marija Vrecl, a teacher with whom he had three daughters later in the emigration. After serving a military service in the army of the Kingdom of Yugoslavia, he held the rank of reserve sergeant. Before the World War II Melaher was active member of Slovenian Catholic youth organizations and Slovene People's Party.

During World War II 
All Chetniks were considered as enemies by Axis occupiers Yugoslavia who managed to reach quid pro quo arrangements with Chetniks, that allowed them to fight against communist revolutionary irregular forces. In Slovenia, Mehaler and his detachment were exemption from that kind of arrangement. According to some estimates, Štajerska Chetnik detachment was the only anti-Communist military unit that consistently attacked Axis occupiers throughout the war. The detachment under Melaher's command had 200 men. In October 1942 Gestapo arrested Melaher, but he managed to escape and continued his struggle. Melaher successfully recruited many of his men among Slovenian deserters from German units.

This Chetnik unit led by Melaher operated against German troops in the region of Haloze and Ptuj. According to one report of Yugoslav communist forces, Melaher's Chetnik detachment and operated in the region of Lenart v Slovenskih Goricah. Melaher's Chetnik detachment received British supplies as airdrops until 1944 and published resistance newspaper Blood and Land. Melaher was author of most of its texts.

In April 1945 Chetniks from Melahers Štajerska detachment were put under command of Ivan Prezelj and enlisted as part of the Slovenian People's Army. In 1945 Melaher signed an cease-fire agreement with German occupying forces.

After World War II 

With some members of his detachment he escaped in front of Soviet Red Army and Yugoslav Communist forces, first to Italy and than to USA. Melaher died on 10 June 1991, in Cleveland, Ohio.

References

Sources 

 
 
 
 
 

1913 births
1991 deaths
Chetnik personnel of World War II
Slovenian Chetnik personnel of World War II
Yugoslav emigrants to the United States